Eric P. Wendt is a retired United States Army lieutenant general who last served as the 5th commander of the NATO Special Operations Headquarters, departing command on January 29, 2021. As a general officer, Wendt previously served as the United States Security Coordinator for the Israel-Palestinian Authority from November 2017 to October 2019, with prior general officer terms as the chief of staff of the United States Pacific Command from May 2015 to September 2016, as the commanding general of the John F. Kennedy Special Warfare Center and School from 2014 to 2015, as the commander of Special Operations Command Korea from  2012 to 2014, and as the deputy commander of Regional Command North of the International Security Assistance Force from 2011 to 2012 in Afghanistan.

Wendt was commissioned in the Army as a second lieutenant via the ROTC program at the University of California, Santa Barbara in 1986, graduating with a B.A. degree in law and society, and later graduated from the Naval Postgraduate School with a M.A. degree in national security affairs. He retired effective March 1, 2021 after over 34 years of distinguished service, including over 4 years in the infantry and 30 years as a Special Forces Green Beret. He speaks Arabic and Korean.

President Donald Trump nominated him to be United States ambassador to Qatar on September 22, 2020, but his confirmation hearing was not scheduled before the 116th Congress permanently adjourned on January 3, 2021, so his nomination was returned without action.

References

Living people
Date of birth missing (living people)
United States Army personnel of the Iraq War
United States Army personnel of the War in Afghanistan (2001–2021)
Recipients of the Defense Distinguished Service Medal
Recipients of the Distinguished Service Medal (US Army)
Recipients of the Defense Superior Service Medal
Recipients of the Legion of Merit
United States Army generals
Year of birth missing (living people)